August Emanuel Rudolph von Reuss (8 July 1811 in Bílina, Bohemia26 November 1873 in Vienna), Austrian geologist and palaeontologist, was the son of Franz Ambrosius Reuss (1761–1830) and the father of ophthalmologist August Leopold von Reuss (1841–1924). He was educated for the medical profession, graduating in 1834 at the University of Prague, and afterwards practising for fifteen years at the Bílinská Kyselka (Biliner Sauerbrunn) spa.

In 1849 he gave up his medical practice, and became professor of mineralogy at the university of Prague. There he established a fine mineralogical collection, and he became the first lecturer on geology.

In 1863 he was appointed professor of mineralogy in the University of Vienna. He investigated the Cretaceous fauna of Gosau, and studied the Crustacea, including Entomostraca, the corals, bryozoa, and especially the Foraminifera of various geological formations and countries. He died at Vienna on 26 November 1873.

References 

 

1811 births
1873 deaths
People from Bílina
German Bohemian people
Austrian paleontologists
19th-century Austrian geologists
Austrian carcinologists
Bohemian nobility
Austrian people of German Bohemian descent